Chalaw Sonthong (born 1932) is a Thai basketball player. He competed in the men's tournament at the 1956 Summer Olympics.

References

1932 births
Living people
Chalaw Sonthong
Chalaw Sonthong
Basketball players at the 1956 Summer Olympics
Place of birth missing (living people)